Andrea Romizi (born 9 February 1979) is an Italian politician, mayor of Perugia since 2014.

Biography 
After graduating in Law at the University of Perugia and becoming a lawyer, Romizi began working at the legal office led by Fiammetta Modena, member of The People of Freedom and centre-right candidate at the 2010 Umbrian regional election: in 2009, Romizi is elected to the city council of Perugia.

At the 2014 Italian local elections, Romizi became the centre-right candidate for the office of Mayor of Perugia: after ranking second at the first round, Romizi managed to win the second round, defeating the incumbent Mayor Wladimiro Boccali. Romizi is the first centre-right Mayor of Perugia since World War II.

In December 2018, Romizi announced his intention to run for a second mayoral term at the 2019 local elections. He has been re-elected in May 2019.

References 

1979 births
Living people
Forza Italia politicians
21st-century Italian politicians
People from Assisi
Mayors of Perugia
University of Perugia alumni